Abdoulaye Sadio Diallo (born 28 December 1990) commonly known as Sadio Diallo, is a Guinean professional footballer who plays as a midfielder.

Career
Diallo started his career for the Corsican club SC Bastia in the 2009–10 Ligue 2 season.

In 2010, he made his debut for the Guinea national team.

On 5 June 2011, Diallo scored the third goal in Guinea's 4–1 win over Madagascar which saw them move clear at the top of Group B of the Africa Cup of Nations qualifiers as Nigeria drew 2–2 in Ethiopia.

Career statistics
Scores and results list Guinea's goal tally first, score column indicates score after each Diallo goal.

References

External links
 
 
 

1990 births
Living people
Sportspeople from Conakry
Association football midfielders
Guinean footballers
Guinea international footballers
2012 Africa Cup of Nations players
Ligue 1 players
Ligue 2 players
Championnat National players
Süper Lig players
TFF First League players
SC Bastia players
Stade Rennais F.C. players
FC Lorient players
Yeni Malatyaspor footballers
Hatayspor footballers
Gençlerbirliği S.K. footballers
Ankara Keçiörengücü S.K. footballers
Guinean expatriate footballers
Guinean expatriate sportspeople in France
Expatriate footballers in France
Guinean expatriate sportspeople in Turkey
Expatriate footballers in Turkey